The 2006 Kilkenny Senior Hurling Championship was the 112th staging of the Kilkenny Senior Hurling Championship since its establishment by the Kilkenny County Board. The championship began on 24 September 2006 and ended on 5 November 2006.

James Stephens were the defending champions, however, they were defeated by O'Loughlin Gaels at the semi-final stage.

On 5 November 2006, Ballyhale Shamrcks won the title after a 1–22 to 2–11 defeat of O'Loughlin Gaels in the final at Nowlan Park. It was their 10th championship title overall and their first title since 1991.

Team changes

To Championship

Promoted from the Kilkenny Intermediate Hurling Championship
 Dicksboro

From Championship

Relegated to the Kilkenny Intermediate Hurling Championship
 Glenmore

Results

First round

Relegation play-off

Quarter-finals

Semi-finals

Final

Championship statistics

Top scorers

Top scorers overall

Top scorers in a single game

References

Kilkenny Senior Hurling Championship
Kilkenny Senior Hurling Championship